Breaking Glass is a 1980 British film starring Hazel O'Connor, Phil Daniels and Jonathan Pryce. It was co-produced by Dodi Fayed and written and directed by Brian Gibson, his feature film debut.

The film was screened out of competition at the 1980 Cannes Film Festival.

The soundtrack album, featuring songs performed by O'Connor, reached number 5 in the UK and was certified Gold by the British Phonographic Industry. Two singles, "Eighth Day" and "Will You", both reached the UK Top 10.

Plot
The film depicts the rise and fall of Kate Crowley (Hazel O'Connor), an angry but creative young singer and songwriter. At the beginning of the film, she is discovered by Danny (Phil Daniels), a young man who desperately wants to become a promoter of music bands but is stuck working for another agent (who forces him to buy hundreds of copies of the singles of one of his artists, Suzie Sapphire, to fix the music charts). Danny takes an active part in controlling Kate's career, impressed with her talent if not her band, whom he promptly fires. He arranges auditions and reaches out to former friends, and in doing so Kate's new band, Breaking Glass, is formed. Breaking Glass consists of Kate on vocals and keyboard, best friends Tony (Mark Wingett) and Dave (Gary Tibbs) on lead and bass guitar respectively, the heroin-addicted and partially-deaf Ken (Jonathan Pryce) on saxophone and the 'mental' Mick (Peter-Hugo Daly) on drums.

Danny does his best to promote the band but finds it hard-going. The best he can do is several nights in a pub frequented by neo-Nazis, which, given Kate's anarchist and liberal tendencies that shine through in her songwriting, doesn't go well. After a brawl breaks out one night and the publican refuses to pay the band, Danny finally manages to persuade the anti-establishment Kate to record a demo tape. Danny and Kate then take the demo tape to some gig promoters who show no interest.

The band keep struggling to get by, despite being hassled by the police, and in the meantime Kate realises she is falling in love with Danny. The hard work eventually pays off when the gig promoters finally agree to help out but only by offering the band a contract that Danny describes as "feudal".

Several months pass as the band tours the country, building up a large fanbase. On Christmas Eve the band is stranded when their van breaks down and the British Rail train drivers are on strike. It is at this point that Danny and Kate kiss for the first time and become a couple.

Danny blackmails his former employer (by threatening to reveal how he paid Danny to rig the charts) into attending a gig in London. However, disaster strikes when the band begins to perform and a power-cut occurs. Encouraged by Danny and Mick, the band continues anyway and wins the hostile crowd over. Their performance greatly impresses the music agents Danny forced into coming, and the band is offered a record contract.

Almost immediately things do not go well. Firstly, the band are not amused by how the music agents demand changes to some of the 'offensive' lyrics to secure airplay (such as changing 'kick him in the arse' to 'punch him in the nose'). The recording of the first album does not go well and the agents also reveal that they think Danny is the problem. The chart rise of "Top of the Wheel", the band's first single, parallels the earlier success of Suzie Sapphire.

Forced into playing at a Rock Against Racism benefit concert, the band finds the organisation lacking and tries to leave, only to see a neo-Nazi rally approaching. They decide to play anyway (and a particularly controversial song), which results in a riot breaking out. Danny wants the band to leave but Kate insists on taunting the crowd. That changes when a young man who has been stabbed falls right in front of her, screaming in pain and desperation. This causes Kate to scream.

While recovering from her trauma, Kate is forced to audition for a famous music producer, Bob Woods (Jon Finch), who makes it clear that he wants to produce her music and also be involved with her. Kate's new songs seem to help her recover mentally, but the rest of the band are not so happy. Danny finds himself being pushed more and more into the sidelines and Ken has no saxophone part to play on the big new single.

On tour again, the agents start sowing seeds of discontent among the band, hinting heavily that Danny is the problem. This leads to a confrontation on the tour bus after which Danny storms out and quits. Woods now moves in as the band's manager and becomes Kate's new lover.

After much more success, including a platinum record, the band keeps falling apart. Mick quits, claiming to be bored of the simplistic drum patterns he's been given to play. Kate hates the pressures and lack of control that fame has brought her. Dave and Tony treat Ken terribly, hating him for being a junkie, and he quits the group too. By now the band's name has been amended to Kate & Breaking Glass.

During a radio show which invites listeners to call in, Kate has trouble understanding her fans and gets angry when she is accused of being controlled by her record company, and even more so when someone she thinks is Danny calls in to accuse her of selling out. The next single released is "Big Brother", which features the 'offensive' lyrics completely changed as the music agents originally wanted, proving she has indeed sold out.

Mick and Ken meet with Danny and accuse him of abandoning them and ruining the band but all the same they plead with him to come back and help Kate, yet he refuses.

The film ends with a huge concert and the debut of a new song, although already drugged Kate is forced to go on stage by Chris Campbell, who forcibly holds her down while a doctor injects her in the buttocks with more drugs. Kate goes on with the band, performing the song "Eighth Day" (the American release of the film ends the movie after the song). After the song finishes Kate flees the stage into the London Underground, where she begins hallucinating people dressed as her and her former bandmates, and has a nervous breakdown.

The final scene shows Kate catatonic at a mental hospital where Danny comes to visit her and to bring her a synthesiser.

Cast
 Phil Daniels – Danny
 Hazel O'Connor – Kate Crowley
 Jon Finch – Bob Woods
 Jonathan Pryce – Ken
 Peter-Hugo Daly – Mick
 Mark Wingett – Tony
 Gary Tibbs – Dave
 Charles Wegner – Chris Campbell
 Mark Wing-Davey – Fordyce
 Hugh Thomas – Davis
 Derek Thompson – Andy
 Nigel Humphreys – Brian
 Ken Campbell – Publican
 Lowri Ann Richards – Jane
 Peter Tilbury – CID Officer
 Zoot Money – Promotions Man
 Jim Broadbent – Station Porter
 Richard Griffiths – Studio Engineer
 Janine Duvitski – Jackie
 Michael Kitchen – Larner
 Jonathan Lynn – Radio DJ
 Gary Holton – Punk Guitarist
 Kenneth MacDonald – Security Man

Production
Initial finance of £30,000 used for development was provided by Goldcrest Films. The film was originally announced as a Rock Follies feature project. The development costs were reimbursed to Goldcrest when Allied Stars, run by Dodi Fayed, put up the entire budget of $3 million to make it its first film. Goldcrest and Allied Stars would later work together on Chariots of Fire. 

Filming started 1 October 1979.

References

External links

Paramount Pictures films
1980 films
1980 drama films
1980s English-language films
Punk films
Films directed by Brian Gibson
British drama films
1980s British films
1980 directorial debut films